Niki Rüttimann (born 18 August 1962 in Untereggen) is a Swiss former road bicycle racer. Ruttiman was one of the most important domestiques of the La Vie Claire teams of the mid 1980s. In the 1984 Tour de France he finished 11th overall riding in support of Bernard Hinault who placed 2nd. During the 1985 Tour de France as well as the 1986 Tour de France he was right there between Hinault and Greg LeMond as they battled for Tour victories both years. He finished 13th in 1985 and 7th in 1986 while also winning stage 14. In 1987 he won a stage in the Tour de Romandie and a stage in the Critérium du Dauphiné and went into the Tour supporting Jean-François Bernard being as Hinault had retired and LeMond was recovering from a gunshot wound. Bernard held the yellow jersey late in the race and finished 3rd overall as Ruttiman was there until the end, but abandoned on the final stage in the high mountains. He won two stages and finished 2nd overall in the 1988 Critérium du Dauphiné Libéré.

Major results

1979
 1st  Road race, National Junior Road Championships
1980
 1st Overall Grand Prix Rüebliland
1982
 1st Overall GP Tell
1st Stages 2 & 3
1983
 1st Stage 6 Coors Classic
 3rd Schynberg Rundfahrt
1984
 1st Clásica de San Sebastián
 3rd Overall Tour de Romandie
 4th Subida a Arrate
 5th Overall Critérium du Dauphiné Libéré
1985
 1st Overall Paris–Bourges
 2nd Overall Tour de Suisse
 5th Overall Tour de Romandie
 9th Overall Tirreno–Adriatico
1986
 1st  Overall Étoile de Bessèges
 1st  Overall Route du Sud
 7th Overall Tour de France
1st Stage 14
 7th Overall Critérium International
 9th Overall Giro d'Italia
 10th Giro di Lombardia
1987
 1st Stage 4 Critérium du Dauphiné Libéré
 1st Stage 1 Tour de Romandie
1988
 2nd Overall Critérium du Dauphiné Libéré
1st Stages 1a & 5
 2nd Boucles Parisiennes
 4th Wartenberg Rundfahrt
 10th Overall Tour de Suisse
1989
 1st 
 2nd Road race, National Road Championships
 3rd Tour du Nord-Ouest
 6th Wartenberg Rundfahrt
1990
 7th Tour of Flanders

Grand Tour general classification results timeline

References

External links
 Niki Rüttimann at CyclingRanking.com

1962 births
Swiss male cyclists
Living people
Swiss Tour de France stage winners
Sportspeople from the canton of St. Gallen